Strengsdal is a village and statistical area (grunnkrets) in Nøtterøy municipality, Norway.

The statistical area Strengsdal, which also can include the peripheral parts of the village as well as the surrounding countryside, has a population of 202.

The village Strengsdal is located between Kjøpmannskjær in the southwest and Buerstad in the east. It is considered a part of the urban settlement Årøysund, which covers the southern part of the island and has a population of 2,069.

References

Villages in Vestfold og Telemark